There are 303 American, Canadian, and Puerto Rican colleges and universities classified as Division II for NCAA competition. During the 2022–23 academic year, seven schools are in the process of reclassifying to Division II. Forty-four of the 50 U.S. states, plus the District of Columbia, the commonwealth of Puerto Rico, and the Canadian province of British Columbia are represented. Arizona, Louisiana, Maine, Nevada, Rhode Island, and Wyoming do not currently have D-II institutions.

Division II institutions

Full members

Notes

Reclassifying to Division II
The reclassification process from one NCAA division to another requires three to five years, except for moves to Division II. Moves from Division III or another national governing body (such as the NAIA) to Division II require three years, and moves from Division I to II require two years.

Reclassifying from Division II
The following programs are reclassifying away from NCAA Division II, or have announced definitive plans to do so. Under current NCAA rules, they must have an invitation from a conference to begin the transition to Division I. During the four-year transition period, they are ineligible for the FCS playoffs.

Pending
These schools are actively pursuing Division II membership. Schools wishing to move within the NCAA to Division II must apply no later than February 1 of a given year, with the NCAA making its decision that July.

Sports not in D-II

The NCAA does not conduct separate Division II championships in the following sports:
 Men: Gymnastics, ice hockey, volleyball, water polo (note, however, that no Division II member currently sponsors men's gymnastics)
 Women: Bowling, gymnastics, ice hockey, water polo
 Coeducational: Fencing, rifle, skiing

Some schools have opted to compete in a sport at a higher level and are allowed to do so by the NCAA under certain circumstances. First, when the NCAA placed severe restrictions on the fielding of Division I teams by Division II institutions in 2011, it grandfathered in all then-current D-I teams at D-II schools. Apart from this, Division II members are allowed to compete for Division I championships in sports in which a Division II national championship is not contested.

In some sports, the NCAA only sponsors championships open to all member schools regardless of division, with examples including beach volleyball, fencing, rifle, and water polo. In men's and women's ice hockey and men's volleyball, the NCAA holds Division III championships, but does not hold a separate D-II championship. The NCAA officially classifies all championship events that are open to schools from more than one division as "National Collegiate", except in men's ice hockey, in which the top-level championship is styled as a Division I championship (presumably due to the past existence of a Division II championship in that sport). Division II members are allowed to compete for National Collegiate championships as well as the Division I men's ice hockey championship; in all such sports, they are allowed to operate under the same rules and scholarship restrictions that apply to full Division I members in that sport.

The Northeast-10 Conference (NE-10) sponsors men's ice hockey for its members who choose to remain in D-II, including a postseason tournament.

Several NE-10 members that sponsored women’s ice hockey also competed in the ECAC Women’s East and pursued the ECAC Open title, a women's ice hockey postseason tournament for those teams remaining in D-II but competing as independents during the regular season, but that tournament has been superseded by the New England Women's Hockey Alliance (NEWHA), which began play in 2017 as a scheduling agreement between all of the existing women's National Collegiate independents (including full D-I member Sacred Heart), organized as a full conference in 2018, and received official NCAA recognition in 2019. 

Because the NE-10 is the sole Division II hockey league, its postseason champion cannot compete for the NCAA national hockey championship. The Post University men's team competes as D-II as a single-sport NE-10 member, while its women's team is a member of the NEWHA.

 Future conference affiliations indicated in this list will take effect on July 1 of the stated year. In the case of spring sports, the first year of competition will take place in the calendar year after the conference move becomes official.

Probation

The following is a list of Division II institutions currently on probation by the NCAA in one or more sports. Probation decisions are made by the National Collegiate Athletic Association's Committee on Infractions.

See also

List of NCAA Division II football programs
List of NCAA Division II lacrosse programs
List of NCAA Division II men's soccer programs
List of NCAA Division II women's soccer programs
List of NCAA Division II wrestling programs
List of NCAA Division I institutions
List of NCAA Division III institutions
List of NAIA institutions
List of USCAA institutions
List of NCCAA institutions
List of NCAA Divisions II and III schools competing in NCAA Division I sports

References

Institutions
NCAA
Institutions